The Coalition for Equal Marriage is a British campaign group created in 2012 by Conor Marron and James Lattimore, a same-sex couple, to petition in support of civil marriages for gay couples. The Coalition for Equal Marriage was created in response to the Coalition for Marriage, a Christian group campaigning against same-sex marriage in the United Kingdom.

The coalition's website states the campaign started after Lattimore read a BBC News article regarding the Coalition for Marriage and seeing a comment from Lord Carey stating "The avowed intention to widen the scope of marriage as we see before us is a hostile strike, which rather than strengthening marriage, will destroy its meaning and diminish its importance drastically". Lattimore and his partner began working on the site and mimicked the look and design of the Coalition for Marriage website as a spoof, with Facebook and Twitter campaigns launched a day later. Signatures reached 10,000 roughly ten days afterwards and 40,000 signatures in April 2012.

Signing of Nick Clegg
Deputy Prime Minister Nick Clegg has signed the Coalition for Equal Marriage petition, and in an interview for The Independent Clegg was reported to have called it "a matter of how, not whether, equal marriage becomes legal in England and Wales."

Conor Marron, co-founder of the Coalition for Equal Marriage, released a statement thanking Nick Clegg and the MPs "who have voiced their position on the subject".

Sponsors
The Coalition for Equal Marriage is sponsored by many organisations, including LGBT organisations, anti-bullying groups, charities, political parties, human rights groups and activists, religions and religious groups, community groups, and also media companies.

Secular and humanist organisations

 British Humanist Association
 The Gay & Lesbian Humanist Association
 Humanist & Secularist Liberal Democrats
 National Secular Society
 Pink Triangle Trust
 Rationalist Association

LGBT and human rights organisations

 Consortium
 LAGLA Lesbian and Gay Lawyers
 NUSLGBT
 Peter Tatchell Foundation
 The Rainbow Project
 Scottish Transgender Alliance
 Stonewall
 T-Form

University and community groups

 GRIN
 LGBT Union
 Metro
 NUSScotlandLGBT
 Proud Voices
 Pink Singers
 Space Youth Project

Political groups

 LGBT Labour
 LGBT+ Liberal Democrats
 LGBTIQ Green Party
 LGBTory
 Liberal Youth Scotland

Media

 Attitude magazine
 Bi Community News magazine
 Gay Times magazine
 Gaydar
 Gaydar Radio radio station
 Gaydio radio station
PinkNews online newspaper
 Polari Magazine
 The Pod Delusion
 So So Gay

Religious organisations

 KeshetUK
 Lesbian Gay Christians
 Liberal Judaism (United Kingdom)
 MCC Metropolitan Community Church of North London
 Neo-Druidism
 OneSpirit Interfaith Organization
 Sarbat.net, an LGBT Sikh organisation
 Wicca

Advertising
Mike Buonaiuto created a viral advertisement on behalf of C4EM for release in late April 2012, with a teaser available before. The teaser features stills from the advert to the speech of David Cameron at the Conservative Party conference in 2011, when he announced "I don't support gay marriage in spite of being a Conservative. I support gay marriage because I am a Conservative."

On 25 April 2012, Buonaiuto's short film was released encouraging support for the government plans to legislate in favour of equal civil marriage rights for LGBT people. The video shows British army members returning home to their families, with one reunion turning into a marriage proposal between a same-sex couple. The argument put forth in the video and by Buonaiuto directly is that if gay and straight people can fight in the army together, then they should be able to love and get married the same. Supporting parties, gave their backing to the short film, while PinkNews advertised it directly on their website.
The full advertisement reached 500,000 views in less than one week.

See also

 Civil partnership in the United Kingdom
 Same-sex marriage in the United Kingdom

References

External links
 , the organisation's official website

2012 establishments in the United Kingdom
LGBT political advocacy groups in the United Kingdom
Organizations established in 2012
Same-sex marriage in the United Kingdom